"My Heroine" may refer to:

"My Heroine" Pioneer (The Maine album)
"My Heroine" My Heroine (Silverstein song)